The Cuja River is a river of Cundinamarca, Colombia. It is a tributary of the Sumapaz River, that flows into the Magdalena River, flowing towards the Caribbean Sea.

Description 

The Cuja River originates on the Sumapaz Páramo and flows westward through the municipalities Arbeláez and Fusagasugá, where it meets the Guavio River, Fusagasugá. Upstream of the Guavio River is the Batán River.

See also 

 List of rivers of Colombia

References

Further reading 
 

Rivers of Colombia
Geography of Cundinamarca Department